Arcade is the first studio album by glam metal supergroup Arcade. Released in 1993, the album produced two singles that would land in the Top 30 of the Billboard Mainstream Rock Chart: "Nothin' to Lose" and "Cry No More". The album would prove to be a mild success as it charted #133 on the Billboard 200 and #5 on the Billboard Heatseekers chart.

Track listing

Japanese Bonus Track

Personnel 
 Stephen Pearcy – lead vocals
 Frankie Wilsex – guitar
 Donny Syracuse – guitar
 Michael Andrews – bass
 Fred Coury – drums

Chart positions

Singles - Billboard (North America)

References 

1993 debut albums
Arcade (band) albums